Willamina High School is a public high school in Willamina, Oregon, United States.

Academics
In 2008, 71% of the school's seniors received their high school diploma. Of 84 students, 60 graduated, 17 dropped out, 1 received a modified diploma, and 6 are still in high school.

References

High schools in Yamhill County, Oregon
Public high schools in Oregon